David Folkenflik (born September 15, 1969) is an American reporter based in New York City and serving as media correspondent for National Public Radio. He was also one of the hosts of NPR & WBUR's On Point. His work primarily appears on the NPR news programs Morning Edition and All Things Considered.  He also appeared regularly on the "Media Circus" segment on the former Talk of the Nation.

Early life, family and education
Folkenflik is the son of Vivian and Robert Folkenflik, both college professors at the University of California, Irvine. He is of Jewish descent.

In 1991, he graduated from Cornell University with a degree in History. At Cornell, he was editor in chief of The Cornell Daily Sun and was a member of the Quill and Dagger, Cornell's senior honor society.

Career
Folkenflik started at The Herald-Sun of Durham, North Carolina. He spent more than 10 years at The Baltimore Sun, covering higher education, the United States Congress, and the mass media, before joining NPR in 2004.

He has reported on many topics, including the undisclosed payments made by New York Times reporter Kurt Eichenwald to a teenaged webcam child pornographer named Justin Berry and on the ethical challenges faced by reporters who are also medical doctors who have travelled to Haiti to report on and assist with the recovery after the 2010 Haiti earthquake.

He is active in public service, and has served as a commentator during "The Changing Face of News – What’s Next?" event at the New Hampshire Institute of Politics at Saint Anselm College.

Personal life
In 2010, Folkenflik married Jesse Baker.

Sources

American radio reporters and correspondents
American male journalists
Cornell University alumni
NPR personalities
Living people
1969 births